The Hârja is a left tributary of the river Holod in Romania. It flows into the Holod near Vintere.

References

Rivers of Romania
Rivers of Bihor County